Ethmia hakkarica is a moth in the family Depressariidae. It was described by Ahmet Ömer Koçak in 1986. It is found in Turkey.

References

Moths described in 1986
hakkarica